Joonas Huovinen (born February 23, 1994) is a Finnish professional ice hockey player. He is currently playing for Dunaújvárosi Acélbikák in the Erste Liga.

Huovinen made his Liiga debut playing with Oulun Kärpät during the 2012–13 Liiga season.

References

External links

1994 births
Living people
Asplöven HC players
Ässät players
Dunaújvárosi Acélbikák players
Finnish ice hockey forwards
GKS Tychy (ice hockey) players
Hokki players
Kokkolan Hermes players
Milton Keynes Lightning players
Oulun Kärpät players
Sportspeople from Oulu
Vaasan Sport players